Hugh Finlayson (December 12, 1810 – June 3, 1889) was an Ontario businessman and political figure. He represented Brant North in the Legislative Assembly of Ontario as a Liberal member from 1867 to 1879.

He was born in Edinburgh, Scotland in 1810 and came to North America in 1832. He originally arrived at New York City, made his way to Brantford in Upper Canada in 1835 and settled in Paris, Ontario. He worked as a saddle and harness maker and also operated a tannery. He served as mayor of Paris in 1858 and represented East Brant in the Legislative Assembly of the Province of Canada from 1858 to 1861. In 1867, he was elected to the Ontario legislative assembly. He died in Paris in 1889.

External links 

 

Finlayson, Hughl
1889 deaths
Immigrants to Upper Canada
Mayors of places in Ontario
Members of the Legislative Assembly of the Province of Canada from Canada West
Ontario Liberal Party MPPs
Scottish emigrants to pre-Confederation Ontario